The Mashat (Maşat) is a river of southern Kazakhstan. It is a left tributary of the Arys.

External links
Mashat canyon

Rivers of Kazakhstan